Madan Kaushik is an Indian politician from Bharatiya Janata Party. He was the immediate past BJP's state president in Uttarakhand and serving his fifth term as MLA from Haridwar constituency. He is the former spokesperson for the Government of Uttarakhand. He is a member of the Legislative Assembly from Haridwar. He served as the cabinet minister from 2017 to 2021 and also, from 2007 to 2012 in Bhartiya Janta Party government under the chief minister Trivendra Singh Rawat, Bhuvan Chandra Khanduri and Dr. Ramesh Pokhriyal Nishank. He was first elected as a member of the Legislative assembly in the year 2002 and subsequently in the year 2007, 2012, 2017 and 2022. In 2017, he won the elections with a margin of more than 37,000 votes, thereby getting the 68% of the total polled votes. He further won 2022 elections to serve his fifth term by winning with a margin of more than 15,000 votes.

References

External links
  Madan Kaushik appointed new Uttarakhand BJP chief, replaces Banshidhar Bhagat

People from Haridwar
Bharatiya Janata Party politicians from Uttarakhand
Uttarakhand MLAs 2022–2027
Living people
Uttarakhand MLAs 2017–2022
1965 births